"Sur un air latino" is a 2003 single recorded by the French singer Lorie. Released on 19 May 2003, the song was the third single from her second album Tendrement. It achieved a great success, topping the French and Belgian Singles Charts.

Song information
The song was written and composed by Johnny Williams, Pierre Billon and Lorie herself. The music video was shot on the beach, in Cuba.

The song was not available on the first edition of the album Tendrement, but it features on the second edition, as second track. It is the second track on Lorie's best of. It was also performed during Lorie's second tour and was therefore included on the 2004 live album Week End Tour (15th track). The French compilations Un maxx de tubes Vol. 3, Hits & Co and Hits France 2003 contain the song too.

Chart performance
In France, the single went to number 63 on 11 May 2003, then jumped to number two and finally reached number one for two not consecutive weeks. It dropped slowly on the chart, totaling 17 weeks in the top ten, 27 weeks in the top 50 and 31 weeks in the top 100. It was certified Platinum disc by the French certifier, the SNEP, and featured at number six on the End of the Year Chart.

In Belgium, the single charted from 31 March 2003. It debuted at number 12, climbed up to number three and hit number one where it stayed for four non consecutive weeks. It remained for 16 weeks in the top ten and 23 weeks in the top 40. It hit Platinum status and was the 6th best-selling single of the year. As of August 2014, the song was the 17th best-selling single of the 21st century in France, with 570,000 units sold.

The single had a long chart trajectory on the Swiss Singles Chart (33 weeks). It entered it at number 15 on 6 June, reached number eight in its ninth week and stayed in the top ten for seven week. It dropped slowly on the chart and appeared in the top 50 for 23 weeks. To date, it is Lorie's more successful single in this country.

Track listings
 CD single + Limited Edition 
 "Sur un air latino" — 3:31
 "Je t'aime maman" — 3:58
 "L'homme de ma vie" — 3:28
+ Bonus : four pages with song's lyrics

 CD single
 "Sur un air latino" (radio édit) - 3:36
 "Sur un air latino (instrumental) - 3:36

 CD maxi
 "Sur un air latino" (havana club mix)  
 "Sur un air latino" (havana radio edit)  
 "Sur un air latino" (groovy latino club mix)  
 "Sur un air latino" (german club mix)

 Digital download
 "Sur un air latino" — 3:31
 "Sur un air latino" (2004 live version) — 6:07

Charts and certifications

Peak positions

Year-end charts

Certifications

References

External links
 "Sur un air latino", lyrics + music video

2003 singles
Lorie (singer) songs
Ultratop 50 Singles (Wallonia) number-one singles
SNEP Top Singles number-one singles